Albert Flahaut (born 1897, date of death unknown) was a French racing cyclist. He rode in the 1926 Tour de France.

References

1897 births
Year of death missing
French male cyclists
Place of birth missing